The Hand that First Held Mine is a novel written by Maggie O'Farrell, about the spirited journey of Lexie Sinclair, a bright, tempestuous woman who finds her way from rural Devon to the centre of postwar London's burgeoning art scene. Soon, she falls deeply in love.

First published in 2010 by Headline Review. The book won the Costa Book Awards in 2010.

Plot summary
The story progresses in two different timelines. It tells the story of Lexie Sinclair, a young English woman who falls in love with magazine editor Innes Kent, after escaping from her stifling family to London in the 1950s. The other timeline, set in the present day, deals with Elina, a Finnish-Swedish painter who had a near-fatal Caesarian section and gives birth to the son of film editor Ted. The theme of the novel is motherhood and how it changes one's perception of the world. The link between the two timelines is not established until the end of the novel.

References 

2010 novels
Costa Book Award-winning works
Novels set in the 1950s
Headline Publishing Group books